The Ambassador from Israel to Paraguay is Israel's foremost diplomatic representative in Paraguay.

List of ambassadors
Yoed Magen 2019 -
Zeev Harel 2017 - 2018 
Peleg Lewi 2015 - 2017
Meron Reuben 2000 - 2002
Yoav Bar-On 1995 - 1998
Shmuel Meirom 1990 - 1994
Yaacov Brakha 1986 - 1990
Berl Zerubavel 1981 - 1984
Netanel Matalon (Non-Resident, Motevideo) 1979 - 1981
Avraham Sarlouis 1976 - 1978
Shlomo Catz 1972 - 1975
Binyamin Varon 1969 - 1972
Moshe Alon (Non-Resident, Montevideo) 1965 - 1969
Yeshayahu Anug (Non-Resident, Montevideo) 1963 - 1965
Itzhak Harkavi (Non-Resident, Montevideo) 1960 - 1963
Minister Arieh Leon Kubovy (Non-Resident, Buenos Aires) 1954 - 1958
Minister Jacob Tsur (Non-Resident, Buenos Aires) 1949 - 1953

References

Paraguay
Israel